Four ships of the United States Navy have borne the name USS Hull, in honor of Commodore Isaac Hull.

, was a  launched in 1934 and lost in a typhoon in 1944

See also

United States Navy ship names